Rand West City Local Municipality is a local municipality of South Africa. It was established after the August 2016 local elections by the merging of Randfontein and Westonaria local municipalities. It is a division of the West Rand District Municipality.

Politics

The municipal council consists of 69 members elected by mixed-member proportional representation. 35 councillors are elected by first-past-the-post voting in 35 wards, while the remaining 34 are chosen from party lists so that the total number of party representatives is proportional to the number of votes received. In the election of 1 November 2021 the African National Congress (ANC) lost their majority of  seats on the council.

The following table shows the results of the election.

Management
The power utility Eskom has identified Rand West as a municipality with a poor payment record. In 2021 it owed Eskom over R510 million.

References

 
Local municipalities of the West Rand District Municipality